The Parnidis Dune is a drifting (semi-permanent) coastal sand dune on the Curonian Spit, southeast  of Nida, Lithuania, near the Lithuania-Russia border of the spit.

In the past its height was over 60, but it decreased because the dune is steadily moving eastwards and discharging its sands into the Curonian lagoon, prominently  at the  under the wind-induced saltation.

Ecology
Based on the dune, the Parnidis Landscape Reserve was created within the Curonian Spit National Park to preserve a unique natural dune landscape, some of which are bare, and some forested, as well as the coastal areas of the dunes at both the Baltic Sea and the Curonian Lagoon. It is the only place with drifting dunes in the National Park. 

The Parnidis dune is almost bare, but there are many patches of vegetative habitats, which are subject to degradation due to natural and anthropogenic reasons. For example the sand blown from the peaks of the dune slides down the slope and destroys the vegetation. The same effect is from rain washouts. Also people climbing the dune in non-prescribed places disturb the sand, with the same consequences.

Tourism
The Parnidis Dune is one of the main tourist attractions of the Curonian Spit National Park. A scenic viewpoint, Parnidis Dune Observation Deck,  was constructed at the highest location on the dune, from which you can see both the sea  and the lagoon.

Due to the fragility of the moving sand, the visitors' tracks were constructed and certain areas are specifically marked where walking is prohibited.

, experts estimated the allowable recreational limit to be 25 dune visitors per square meter in half a day.

Sundial

By the observation deck there is a large granite sundial built in 1995 on the top of the dune. It also includes small steps covered with granite slabs, carved with hour and half-hour notches, as well as one notch for each month, and four additional notches for solstices and equinoxes. The sundial was rebuilt in 2011 following storm damage. The place where the sundial pillar was broken is clearly seen after its reconstruction. 

References

External links
PARNIDŽIO KOPOS RELJEFO KAITOS TYRIMAS TAIKANT GIS TECHNOLOGIJAS (Griksaite K. (2017) Parnidis Dune Terrain Change Study Using GIS Technology'', Measurement Engineering Professional Bachelor's thesis) 

Neringa Municipality
Landforms of Lithuania
Dunes of Europe
Tourist attractions in Klaipėda County
Sundials